Alan Rice may refer to:
 Alan Rice (cricketer), English cricketer
 Alan Rice (wrestler), American wrestler

See also
 Alan Handford-Rice, Kenyan sport shooter
 Alan Rice-Oxley, British World War I flying ace
 Allen Rice, American football player